is a Japanese manga artist. His best known works are Sexy Commando Gaiden: Sugoi yo!! Masaru-san which was published in Weekly Shōnen Jump from 1995 to 1997 and which was adapted into a 48-episode anime series produced by Magic Bus; and Pyu to Fuku! Jaguar which was also serialized in Weekly Shōnen Jump between 2000 and 2010, adapted into an anime film and a live action film in 2008.

Works

References

External links
  
 

Manga artists from Kumamoto Prefecture
1974 births
People from Kumamoto Prefecture
Living people